The Brewer's Art is a brewpub and restaurant located in Baltimore, Maryland that opened in September 1996. In 2008, it was named by Esquire magazine as the #1 Best Bar in America.

Beers

Ozzy/Beazly
In March 2014, Ozzy Osbourne issued a cease and desist order to the Brewer's Art, demanding that they change the name and packaging design of their Belgian strong pale ale, Ozzy. The beer is now called Beazly. The beer is a tribute to the Belgian beer Duvel.

Resurrection
The Resurrection is an abbey-style dubbel and is made with five types of barley malt and a lot of sugar.

In popular culture
Brewer's Art is used as a location in season 3, episode eight of The Wire, "Moral Midgetry".

References

External links
 

Beer brewing companies based in Maryland
Restaurants in Baltimore
1996 establishments in Maryland